Nightside is a series of twelve fantasy novels by author Simon R. Green.

Setting
The series is focused on John Taylor, a private investigator based in the fictional Nightside, a dark, hidden netherworld of London in which the supernatural and science fiction super-technology co-exist. Dark, cynical, and humorous, the books offer an adventure into the Nightside, where classic pulp PI novels blend with fantasy and science fiction.

The series

United States
 Something from the Nightside (New York, Ace 2003), 
 Agents of Light and Darkness (New York, Ace 2003), 
 Nightingale's Lament (New York Ace 2004), 
 Hex and the City (New York Ace 2005), 
 Paths not Taken (New York Ace September 2005), 
 Sharper than a Serpent's Tooth (Ace February 28, 2006), 
 Hell to Pay (Ace December 27, 2006), 
 The Unnatural Inquirer (Ace January 2, 2008), 
 Just Another Judgement Day (Ace January 6, 2009), 
 The Good, the Bad, and the Uncanny (Ace January 5, 2010), 
 A Hard Day's Knight (Ace January 4, 2011), 
 The Bride Wore Black Leather (Ace January 3, 2012),

United Kingdom
 Into the Nightside (Nightside Omnibus 1) (Solaris Books, 2008), : A collection of the first and second Nightside novels.
 Haunting the Nightside (Nightside Omnibus 2) (Solaris Books September 1, 2008), : A collection of the third and fourth Nightside novels.
 The Dark Heart of the Nightside (Solaris Books October 6, 2008), : A collection of the fifth and sixth Nightside novels.
 Damned if you Do in the Nightside (Nightside Omnibus 4) (Solaris Books, 2009),: A collection of the seventh and eighth Nightside novels.
 Just Another Judgement Day in the Nightside (Nightside Omnibus 5) (Solaris Books, 2010): A collection of the ninth and tenth Nightside novels.

Short fiction
These nine stories, along with the new novella The Big Game, were collected in Tales From the Nightside (Ace January 6, 2015).

"The Nightside, Needless to Say" in Powers of Detection (Ace, 2004), . An anthology of twelve paranormal detective stories. The Nightside story features Larry Oblivion.
"Razor Eddie’s Big Night Out" in Cemetery Dance #55, (Cemetery Dance, 2006), ISSN 1047-7675. A short story starring Razor Eddie.
"Appetite for Murder" in Unusual Suspects (Ace, 2008), . The Nightside story features Ms. Fate.
"The Difference a Day Makes" in Mean Streets (Roc, 2010), . An anthology of assorted novellas tied to existing crime/fantasy series. The Nightside novella features John Taylor and Dead Boy.
"Some of These Cons Go Way Back" in Cemetery Dance #60 (Cemetery Dance, 2009), ISSN 1047-7675.
"Hungry Hearts" in Down These Strange Streets (Ace, 2011), . An anthology edited by George R.R. Martin centering on urban fantasy detectives. This story features John Taylor.
"The Spirit of the Thing" in Those Who Fight Monsters (Edge, 2011), .
"Dorothy's Dream in Oz Reimagined: New Tales from the Emerald City and Beyond (47North 2013), . An anthology edited by John Joseph Adams and Douglas Cohen, illustrated by Galen Dara
"How Do You Feel" in "Hex Appeal" (St. Martin's Griffin, 2012), . An anthology edited by P.N. Elrod. Nightside story that features Deadboy.

References

Fantasy novels by fictional universe
Crossover novels